Barry Rosen is an American former diplomat who was held hostage during the 1979–1981 Iran hostage crisis.

Rosen was the press attaché at the U.S. Embassy in Tehran when it was seized by militants on November 4, 1979. He was held for 444 days, until the hostages' release on January 20, 1981. Regarding his hostage experience, Rosen said, "We were the first victims of modern state-sponsored terrorism." Along with other American hostages, he has been part of a lawsuit against the Iranian government, seeking justice for the suffering they endured. In his view, "Iranians need to know that you just can't do this in this world, abrogating international law, walking into an embassy, taking over people. They really didn’t learn a lesson from the hostage crisis."

In January 2022, Rosen went on hunger strike, demanding that the 2015 Iran nuclear deal not be revived without the release of foreign nationals being held in Iran. Rosen stopped his hunger strike after five days after US negotiators said that a deal without the release of the hostages was not likely.

References

20th-century American diplomats
American people taken hostage
Iran hostage crisis
Living people
Year of birth missing (living people)